Gibson's Covered Bridge, also known as Harmony Hill Bridge, is an historic, wooden, covered bridge which is located in East Bradford Township and West Bradford Township, Chester County, Pennsylvania. 

It was listed on the National Register of Historic Places in 1980.

History and architectural features
A  Burr truss bridge, which was erected in 1872, this historic structure features stepped portals and horizontal clapboard siding, and crosses the East Branch Brandywine Creek.

It was listed on the National Register of Historic Places in 1980. 

The bridge was damaged and closed by flooding caused by Hurricane Ida on September 1, 2021.

References 
 

Covered bridges on the National Register of Historic Places in Pennsylvania
Covered bridges in Chester County, Pennsylvania
Bridges completed in 1872
Wooden bridges in Pennsylvania
Bridges in Chester County, Pennsylvania
National Register of Historic Places in Chester County, Pennsylvania
Road bridges on the National Register of Historic Places in Pennsylvania
Burr Truss bridges in the United States